Île Saint-Germain is an island located in the Seine in Issy-les-Moulineaux in the département of Hauts-de-Seine near Paris, France. It once housed a military camp that was later abandoned, but the island was redeveloped in 1980. The island is divided into two parts. The developed side includes offices and a residential area. The other side includes a park that includes the Tour aux Figures (Tower of Figures) , a monumental sculpture by Jean Dubuffet. The Île Seguin is downstream.

Gallery

Islands of the River Seine
Islands of Hauts-de-Seine
Île-de-France region articles needing translation from French Wikipedia